Ilmen may refer to:

Lake Ilmen, a lake in Russia
Il’mena, a Russian ship
Middle-earth cosmology#Ilmen, an atmospheric region of J. R. R. Tolkien's Middle-earth stories